The men's 20 km race walk at the 2013 Summer Universiade was held on July 9.

Medalists

Individual

Team

Results

Individual standing

Team standing

References
Results

20K
2013